Shahid Gangalal National Heart Centre (SGNHC) is a hospital which provides cardiac care, diagnostic and treatment procedures in Kathmandu, Nepal. The hospital is named after Gangalal Shrestha. It is the first cardiac tertiary center in Nepal.

Services
The hospital provides the following services:

Cardiac surgery
Coronary revascularization
Valve surgery
Congenital heart repair
Aortic aneurysm repair

Cardiology
Non-invasive Cardiology
Interventional Cardiology

References

Hospital buildings completed in 1995
Hospitals in Nepal
Hospitals established in 1995
1995 establishments in Nepal